Local elections were held in Denmark on 15 November 2005. 2522 municipal council members were elected in Denmark's 98 municipalities and 205 regional council members in the five regions. Most of these were newly formed municipalities, namely 66 municipalities, that would only begin working from Monday 1 January 2007, as would the newly formed regions, and one municipality, Ærø, which was also part of the reform, which was allowed by the government to commence work for the first time already Sunday 1 January 2006. So the first term of office in this newly created municipality was the whole period of four years from 2006 until 2009. The reform was approved 26 June 2005 by the lawmakers in the Folketing and signature by the head of state (when?). The 238 municipal councils (Danish: kommunalbestyrelser; singular: kommunalbestyrelse) and 13 county councils that were to be abolished 1 January 2007 just continued their work one year more than the term of office (2002-2005) they were elected for until 31 December 2006 and then ceased to exist. Among the remaining 31 municipalities having their new councils elected was Bornholm Regional Municipality that was formed and began its work 1 January 2003. This was only the second time it had a new council elected, the first time being on 29 May 2002, and it was the first time its council served the whole term of office. Bornholm's merger was not a part of the reform, having been decided by the island's voters already on 29 May 2001. It was the new center-right government elected at the end of 2001 that drove the reform through parliament. The 30 municipalities that remained were not merged with other municipalities, so their newly elected councils served the whole term of office 1 January 2006 until 31 December 2009.

Results

Results of regional elections
The Ministry of interior informed that voter turnout was 69.4%. The regions are not municipalities, and are not allowed to levy any taxes, but are financed only through block grants from the central government and the municipalities within each region.
The results of the regional elections:

Number of councillors and political parties in the Regional Councils

Results of municipal elections
The Ministry of interior informed that voter turnout was 69.5%. The results of the municipal elections:

Number of councillors and political parties in the Municipal Councils

Mayors in the municipalities
The mayors (Danish:Borgmester; plural:Borgmestre) of the 98 municipalities heads the council meetings and is the chairman of the finance committee in each of their respective municipalities. Only in Copenhagen, this mayor - the head of the finance committee and council meetings - is called the Lord Mayor (Danish:Overborgmester).

Old and new mayors in the municipalities
The term of office for the mayors elected by the majority of councillors among its members in each municipal council is the same as for the councils elected. The correct name for the municipality on the somewhat remote island of Bornholm is Regional Municipality, because the municipality also handles several tasks not carried out by the other Danish municipalities but by the regions.

References 

2005
Danish local elections
November 2005 events in Europe